Max Vatanen (born 26 September 1990) is a Finnish rally driver. He made his WRC debut in 2014 Rally de Portugal driving a Ford Fiesta R2. His father is Ari Vatanen.

Results

WRC results

Drive DMACK Cup results

References

External links

Profile at eWRC-results.com

1990 births
Living people
Finnish rally drivers
World Rally Championship drivers